Tephrocybe is a genus of about 40 species of mushroom, with a widespread distribution in temperate areas. The genus was circumscribed by Dutch mycologist Marinus Anton Donk in 1962.

Species

References

External links

Lyophyllaceae
Agaricales genera